Jhon Fredy Miranda Rada  (born 7 March 1997) is a Colombian footballer who plays as a forward for Tampico Madero.

Career

Before the second half of 2015/16, Miranda joined the youth academy of Italian Serie A side Chievo.

Before the 2017 season, he signed for Unión Magdalena in the Colombian second division.

References

External links
 

Colombia youth international footballers
Colombian footballers
Living people
Expatriate footballers in Italy
Association football forwards
1997 births
Colombian expatriate footballers
Colombian expatriate sportspeople in Italy
Categoría Primera A players
Cúcuta Deportivo footballers
Categoría Primera B players
Patriotas Boyacá footballers
Unión Magdalena footballers
Independiente Santa Fe footballers
Sportspeople from Magdalena Department